The Lamu Archipelago is located in the Indian Ocean close to the northern coast of Kenya, to which it belongs. The islands lie between the towns of Lamu and Kiunga, near the Coast Province. It is a part of Lamu District.

The largest of the islands are Pate Island, Manda Island and Lamu Island. Smaller islands include Kiwayu, which lies in the Kiunga Marine National Reserve, and Manda Toto. Today the largest town in the archipelago is Lamu Town, on Lamu Island. The town is on the World Heritage List.

The archipelago contains several archaeological/historical sites of great significance, such as Takwa and Manda Town (both on Manda Island) and Shanga (on Pate Island). Some  have been partially excavated in later years, shedding important new light on Swahili history and culture.

There are some other accounts that mention Chinese ships of Zheng He's fleet sinking near Lamu Island in Kenya in 1415. Survivors settled on the island and married local women. This has been proven recently by archaeological work on the island that has resulted in the finding of evidence to suggest this connection. Further DNA testing done on some residents show that they indeed have Chinese ancestors.

References

Bibliography
Allen, James de Vere:  Lamu, with an appendix on Archaeological finds from the region of Lamu by H. Neville Chittick. Nairobi: Kenya National Museums. 

Martin, Chryssee MacCasler Perry; Martin, Esmond Bradley: "Quest for the Past: An Historical Guide to the Lamu Archipelago" Marketing and Publishing Ltd., 1973.

Gallery

 
Lamu County
Coast Province
Coastal islands of Kenya
Archaeology of Eastern Africa